Aghuz Koti (also Romanized as Āghūz Kotī) is a village in Lavij Rural District, Chamestan District, Nur County, Mazandaran Province, Iran. At the 2006 census, its population was 23, in 5 families.

References 

Populated places in Nur County